Delta Volantis, Latinized from δ Volantis, is a solitary star in the southern constellation Volans. It has an apparent visual magnitude of +3.97, which is bright enough to be seen with the naked eye. Based upon parallax measurements, is approximately 740 light years from the Sun.

This is an F-type bright giant star with a stellar classification of F6 II. It has an estimated radius 24 times that of the Sun, and shines with more than a thousand times the Sun's luminosity. The outer atmosphere has an effective temperature of 5,386 K.

References

F-type bright giants
Volans (constellation)
Volantis, Delta
Durchmusterung objects
057623
035228
2803